Krasyukovsky is a rural locality (a khutor) and the administrative center of Bolshedmitrovskoye Rural Settlement, Podgorensky District, Voronezh Oblast, Russia. The population was 286 as of 2010.

Geography 
Krasyukovsky is located 14 km north of Podgorensky (the district's administrative centre) by road. Bolshaya Dmitrovka is the nearest rural locality.

References 

Rural localities in Podgorensky District